The Kritonios Crown is an ancient ornate golden crown or wreath dating to the 4th century BC. It was discovered in 1814 in the tomb of a man named Kritonios in Armento, Italy. The crown is now in the Staatliche Antikensammlungen, Munich, Germany.

A twig of oaks forms the base, from which elements with chalices of blue enamel protrude, with intertwined patterns of convolvulus, narcissus, ivy, roses and myrtle. The top features an image of winged goddess. The pedestal on which the goddess stands bears a Greek inscription ΚΡΕΙΘΩΝΙΟΣ ΗΘΗΚΗ ΤΟΝ ΕΤΗΦΑΝΟΝ (Kritonios dedicated this crown). Four male genii and two draped female figures float over the flowers, pointing towards the goddess. The errors in the inscription on the crown indicate the work of a Lucanian artist who studied at Heraclea or Taranto. The style of the headgear's figures indicate a date around 350 BC.

References

4th-century BC artefacts
Crown jewels
Staatliche Antikensammlungen
Individual crowns
Lucania
Archaeological discoveries in Italy
1814 archaeological discoveries
Ancient Greek metalwork